Neptun is a summer resort on the Romanian seacoast, on the Black Sea,  north of Mangalia. It is part of a string of such resorts, Olimp, Jupiter, Cap Aurora, and Venus.

History
Neptun hosts the summer residence of the president, Nufărul (English: The Water Lily).

Built in 1972, it is owned by the Importanne Resort corporation. Located on a beach called "At the flags" (Romanian: La steaguri).

Tourist attractions 
People can go camping, watch open air cinema, play minigolf in one of the 2 minigolf fields, go to nautic sports sites.

Restaurants show a large variety of culinary preparations, with fish specialities, prices for a 1-person meal being under 45 Euros.

Here you can treat degenerative, inflammatory and diarthritic rheumatic diseases, post-traumatic states, diseases of the peripheral nervous system, dermatological diseases, respiratory and other disorders.

Climate 
The marine climate has hot summers (the average temperature in June being over 22 Celsius, most of the days being sunny, and winters being gentle with rare snows. The average temperature being 11.2 Celsius, and rains are low (under 400 mm yearly).

Personalities
 Inna - Romanian singer, winner of two MTV Europe Music Awards and best-selling music act from Eastern Europe of the current decade.

External links

Mangalia
Seaside resorts in Romania